Ayazabad may refer to:

Ayazabad, Fars
Ayazabad, Lorestan